William Henry Shirreff (baptised 4 April 1785 – 1 December 1847) was a British Royal Navy officer, captain of , , , and . He had six children four of whom were daughters. He had two notable daughters, Maria Georgina Grey and Emily Anne Eliza Shirreff, who transformed the education of British women. He retired as Rear-Admiral of the Blue.

Biography
Shirreff was born in 1785 and he joined the Royal Navy on 1 January 1796.

In 1810, he married Elizabeth Murray, the oldest daughter of the lawyer and Member of Parliament David Murray, a brother of Alexander Murray, 7th Lord Elibank.

From October 1812 until he invalided in July 1814, Shirreff commanded the frigate Barrosa on the coast of North America and in the West Indies.

From 10 September 1817 until September 1821 he commanded Andromache. When patrolling the west coast of South America in protection of the British interests in the region and in support of local independence movement against Spanish authority in the early 19th century when he was advised by Captain William Smith about the discovery of the South Shetland Islands in March 1819. Later that year Shirreff chartered Smith's brig, the Williams, sending Lieutenant Edward Bransfield on board with the mission to survey and map the new lands.

From January to November 1830 he was the captain of Admiral Thomas Baker's flagship the 76 gun . In 1831, he was appointed to Gibraltar. He and his family lived there until 1834. One of his sons had died in 1829 and the other died whilst they were in Gibraltar.

Shirreff was promoted in 1846 to Rear-Admiral of the Blue.

Honour
Cape Shirreff at the north extremity of Ioannes Paulus II Peninsula on Livingston Island, in the South Shetland Islands is named after William Shirreff.

References

Sources 
 Alan Gurney, Below the Convergence: Voyages Toward Antarctica, 1699-1839, Penguin Books, New York, 1998

Royal Navy rear admirals
Date of birth missing
1785 births
1847 deaths